Jaroslav Kadavý (22 January 1912 – 4 January 2000) was a Czech cross-country skier. He competed in the men's 18 kilometre event at the 1948 Winter Olympics.

References

External links

1912 births
2000 deaths
Czech male cross-country skiers
Czech male Nordic combined skiers
Olympic cross-country skiers of Czechoslovakia
Olympic Nordic combined skiers of Czechoslovakia
Cross-country skiers at the 1948 Winter Olympics
Nordic combined skiers at the 1948 Winter Olympics
Place of birth missing